Trnovo ( or) is a village in western Slovenia in the Municipality of Nova Gorica. It is located on the high Trnovo Forest Plateau in the traditional Slovene Littoral region.

Mass grave
Trnovo is the site of a mass grave from the period immediately after the Second World War. It contains the remains of Home Guard and Italian prisoners of war and Slovene civilians murdered in May 1945.

Church
The parish church in the settlement is dedicated to Our Lady of the Snows and belongs to the Diocese of Koper.

References

External links
Trnovo on Geopedia

Populated places in the City Municipality of Nova Gorica